The following lists events that happened during 1945 in South Africa.

Incumbents
 Monarch: King George VI.
 Governor-General and High Commissioner for Southern Africa: Nicolaas Jacobus de Wet.
 Prime Minister: Jan Christiaan Smuts.
 Chief Justice: Ernest Frederick Watermeyer.

Events
 22 May – The South African Bureau of Standards (SABS) is established.
 26 June – Prime Minister Jan Smuts represents South Africa in San Francisco at the drafting of the United Nations Charter.

Births
 3 February – Marius Weyers, actor
 8 June – Nicky Oppenheimer, mining magnate
 27 June – Omar Badsha, photographer, trade unionist and political activist.
 21 July – Barry Richards, cricketer
 28 September – Pieter-Dirk Uys, performer, author, satirist, and social activist.
 5 October – Riaan Cruywagen, news reader and voice artist
 16 October – Kaizer Motaung, footballer, founder & chairman of Kaizer Chiefs F.C.
 22 October – Lillian Dube, actress & TV host
 17 December – Belinda Bozzoli, academic and politician (d.2020)

Deaths

Railways

Railway lines opened
 4 June – Transvaal: Village Main (Booysens) to Faraday, .

Sports

References

History of South Africa
 
South Africa
South Africa
1940s in South Africa
Years of the 20th century in South Africa